Kim Jung-Sam is a male former international table tennis player from North Korea.

He won a bronze medal at the 1965 World Table Tennis Championships in the Swaythling Cup (men's team event) with Jung Kil-Hwa, Jung Ryang-Woong, Kim Chang-Ho and Pak Sin Il.

Two years later he won a silver medal at the 1967 World Table Tennis Championships in the Swaythling Cup (men's team event) with Kang Neung-Hwa, Jung Ryang-Woong, Kim Chang-Ho and Pak Sin Il.

See also
 List of table tennis players
 List of World Table Tennis Championships medalists

References

North Korean male table tennis players
World Table Tennis Championships medalists
20th-century North Korean people